The Shoppes at Bel Air, formerly Bel Air Mall, is a super-regional shopping mall, located in Mobile, Alabama, United States. It is the oldest continuously operating enclosed super-regional mall in Alabama and serves as one of the primary retail venues for the west Mobile shopping district located at the vicinity of Airport Boulevard (Mobile County Highway 56) and Interstate 65. Currently, Belk, Dillard's, JCPenney, Surge Entertainment Center, and Target serve as the mall's anchor stores; the mall also features more than 130 stores and restaurants.

History 
More than ten years of research and planning took place before Bel Air Mall finally came to fruition in August 1967. Designed by the architecture firm of Herbert H. Johnson Associates of Washington, DC, the enclosed mall was developed by WKRG-TV founder Kenneth R. Giddens, William Lyon and Jay Altmayer as the centerpiece of an automobile-centric edge city known as Bel Air. Over the years, the mall would be complemented by extensive commercial developments in the form of movie theaters, communal strip malls, office complexes and upscale apartment complexes in surrounding Bel Air development sites. It was originally decorated with nine Grecian statues that "originally stood at Versailles and were cast in the 1850s by order of Napoleon III." The mall took its name from its location at the intersection of Beltline Highway and Airport Boulevard.

Hammel's would become D. H. Holmes in 1973. D. H. Holmes, a New Orleans-based department store, subsequently added a second level to the building and transformed it into a  hub for its Gulf Coast operations. In 1974, a  JCPenney store would serve as a two-level anchor for Bel Air Mall's new north–south enclosed mall corridor. With the completion of this mall expansion project, Bel Air Mall became Alabama's largest regional mall, a title it would retain until the 1986 debut of Riverchase Galleria in suburban Birmingham.

In February 1984, Parisian would serve as the  anchor of a  mall expansion just east of JCPenney. Sporting a modern interpretation of French Colonial architectural style, this expansion included a food court featuring a sunken seating area, landscaping and water features, a Ruby Tuesday casual dining restaurant and several new in-line retailers. Its exterior entrance would be marked with a two-level structure, although the second level was inaccessible and essentially functionless. In 1989 Arkansas-based Dillard's would enter the South Alabama market, with the acquisition of the D. H. Holmes chain.

Bel Air Mall began the 1990s with a $14 million overhaul which updated the mall's image. The signage was updated. The white modernist facades of the mall complex were enhanced with soft and warmer tones, the massive surface lots were extensively landscaped, and in the most noticeable design change, the two-tiered entrance structures which flanked the food court and main entrances were replaced with less dramatic canopied structures.

Bel Air Mall's most dramatic expansion and renovation of the decade would occur in 1996. In March of that year, discount retailer Target announced it would be locating its first South Alabama store at the mall. This served as the catalyst for a $40 million project that would see expansion and related renovation projects at the four other anchor stores. The food court and a couple of in-line merchants, including Bailey Banks and Biddle, were demolished for Target's  debut. Dillard's undertook a substantial interior and exterior renovation, while JCPenney made storewide changes.

The mall would become Colonial Mall Bel Air in the summer of 2000, following Colonial Properties acquisition of the mall in 1998. It would then revert to Bel Air Mall in 2007. Following the sale of 38 Parisian stores to Belk in August 2006, the Parisian store at Bel Air Mall was rebranded as a Belk store in September 2007.

In November 2008, fashion retailer Forever 21 opened a  XXI Forever store in the former Woolworth's location. Most recently, that general retail space was home to several of Foot Locker's niche-oriented shoe store formats.

Throughout the spring and summer of 2010, JCPenney underwent its most significant renovation in fourteen years. Brighter flooring and upgraded fixtures enhanced the store's new racetrack layout. The opening of a Sephora vendor shop on the first level, visible from the main mall entrance, was among the store's new additions.

In the spring of 2015, an ambitious renovation plan was announced for Bel Air Mall. Traveling from Airport Boulevard, a landscaped main boulevard will carry guests to the redesigned main entrance. Here, a towering new architectural structure has given that main mall entrance increased visibility from the north parking lot and as the anchor for the new exterior streetscape. Two new casual dining restaurants, PF Chang's China Bistro and Grimaldi's Pizzeria have been developed on either side of this main entrance, forming a main entry plaza. Along with new native landscaping, seating areas and water features, this streetscape will be tenanted with upscale specialty stores and restaurants. The former Books-A-Million building, closed Christmas Eve 2013, has been incorporated into the streetscape, providing additional retail space and a second, smaller entry corridor into the mall. At the other end of the original mall wing, adjacent to Dillard's, the long vacant Bel Air Cinema outparcel will be demolished for additional surface parking. The mall and its eventual streetscape were rechristened as The Shoppes at Bel Air in July 2015.

Sears closed its Bel Air location in September 2015, in order for Belk to begin construction on their $15 million flagship department store. The new 237,000 square foot Belk store had its soft opening in late September 2016.

In March 2016, it was announced that fast fashion retailer H&M would develop a 19,000 square foot store at Bel Air. The chain debuted as the mall's newest junior anchor in July 2016.

P.F. Chang's China Bistro opened along the streetscape at the main entrance on February 13, 2017. Grimaldi's Pizzeria (now closed) opened on February 20, 2017 on the opposite side of the main entrance.

In April 2018, it was announced that upscale Brazilian steakhouse chain, Texas de Brazil, would be opening on the streetscape near the main entrance. The churrascaria opened in August 2018. However, P.F. Chang's & Texas de Brazil closed due to the mall being sold to Kohan Retail Investment Group in late 2020.

Anchor timeline
 Anchor 1 was Sears from August 1967 to September 2015 and is Belk from September 2016.
 Anchor 2 was Hammel's from August 1967 to March 1973, D. H. Holmes from April 1973 to 1989, and is Dillard's from 1989
 Anchor 3 is JCPenney from 1974
 Anchor 5 is Target from 1996

See also 
 Cordova Mall
 Pelican Place at Craft Farms
 Springdale Mall
 Eastern Shore Centre

References

External links 
Official website

Buildings and structures in Mobile, Alabama
Shopping malls established in 1967
Shopping malls in Alabama
Tourist attractions in Mobile, Alabama
Kohan Retail Investment Group